Lake Conlin is a lake in Osceola County, Florida, in the United States.

It was formerly known as "Lake X", and was used for testing new speedboat designs.

References

Conlin
Econlockhatchee River
Conlin